The 2008–09 Liga Indonesia Premier Division (also known as Liga Esia for sponsorship reasons) was the 14th season of the Liga Indonesia Premier Division. It was the first season for the Liga Indonesia Premier Division as the second tier of the Indonesian football pyramid, following the creation of the Indonesia Super League as the first tier.

Changes from 2007–08 season
The Football Association of Indonesia's decision to create a new Indonesia Super League relegated the Liga Indonesia Premier Division to the second tier of Indonesian football for the first time.

For the 2007 season, teams were allocated to one of two groups (with 15 and 14 teams respectively) in the first round. The top four in each group advanced to the second round, or quarter final. The eight teams in the second round were divided into two groups of four, the top two teams in each group advancing to the semifinal in a knock-out system. Champions, runners-up, and 3rd-place teams were promoted to the  Indonesia Super League, while the 4th-place team faced the 15th-place team from the Indonesia Super League in a promotion/relegation play-off match. The 14th and 15th-place teams in the first round from each group were relegated to the First Division.

Season overview
Twenty-nine teams took part. The season began on 4 August 2008 and the last games were played on 29 May 2009.

The top four from group 1 in the first round were Persisam Samarinda, PSPS Pekanbaru, Mitra Kukar, and Persikabo Bogor, and from group 2 Persema Malang, Persebaya Surabaya, Persiba Bantul, and Persigo Gorontalo. The group winners – Persisam Samarinda and Persema Malang – hosted the quarter finals, both advancing to the semifinal, again as group winners. In the semifinal Persisam Samarinda beat PSPS Pekanbaru and Persema Malang beat Persebaya Surabaya. The championship was won by Persisam Samarinda with a 1–0 victory over Persema Malang.

Persisam Samarinda, Persema Malang, and PSPS Pekanbaru were automatically promoted to the Indonesia Super League. The promotion/relegation playoff was won by Persebaya Surabaya, who beat Indonesia Super League 15th-place team PSMS Medan in a penalty shoot-out to also win promotion. Persibat Batang, PSP Padang, and Persekabpas Pasuruan were relegated to the Liga Indonesia First Division.

On 12 November 2008, in their match away to Persibom Bolaang Mongondow at Ambang Stadium, Kotamobagu, PSIR Rembang players attacked and injured the referee. The incident began when referee Muzair awarded a penalty to Persibom. Angered by the decision, PSIR players punched and kicked the referee, knocking him to the ground and trampling on him; the bruised official had to be rushed to hospital. A similar fate almost befell his replacement, Jusman R.A. He was chased and stripped naked on the field of play after showing a red card to a PSIR player who committed a bad challenge. The match ended 1–0 for Persibom. PSIR were suspended for two years as a result, but on appeal on 1 December 2008 the suspension was lifted, and their next match was rescheduled. The day after the incident PSIR players Yongki Rantung, Tadis Suryanto and Stevie Kusoi were banned from football for life. Five days later Stanley Mamuaya also received a life ban, and fellow players Stanley Katuuk, Gery Mandagi, and M Orah were banned from football for two years. Muzair Usman, Jusman R.A and match inspector Sukarno Wahid subsequently received a reward from PSSI in recognition of their justice, bravery and loyalty, which was considered to have promoted the image of football in Indonesia.
 
On 7 March 2009, during a match between Persela Lamongan and PKT Bontang at Mulawarman Stadium, Jumadi Abdi was hospitalized after colliding with Persela's Deny Tarkas. Abdi suffered an injury to the stomach and had surgery on his intestines, but died eight days later.

Teams
Promoted from First Division:
PSP Padang
PSAP Sigli
Persih Tembilahan
PSPS Riau
Persikad Depok
Persiku Kudus
Persikab Bandung
Persibat Batang
Persibo Bojonegoro
Persiba Bantul
Gresik United
PSIR Rembang
Mitra Kukar F.C.
Persigo Gorontalo
Persisam Putra Samarinda

Stadiums and locations

Groups

The competition was divided into two groups, based on geography. Group 1 or West Group was for clubs from Sumatera,  Kalimantan and the Western part of Java, while Group 2 or East Group was for clubs from the Eastern part of Java and Eastern Indonesia.

First round

Second round

Note : All matches played in Malang.

Note : All matches played in Samarinda.

Knockout phase

Semifinals

Third place playoff

Final

Promotion/relegation playoff
The promotion/relegation play-off match was held in SIliwangi Stadium, Bandung, on 30 June 2009. Persebaya Surabaya, the 4th-place team in the Liga Indonesia Premier Division played PSMS Medan, the 15th-place team in the Indonesia Super League. The winner would play in the Indonesia Super League the following season, while the loser would play in the Liga Indonesia Premier Division.

Awards

Top scorers
This a list of top scorers in the 2008–09 season.

Best Player
 Aldo Baretto (Persisam Samarinda)

References

External links
2008–2009 Liga Indonesia Premier Division Match Schedule 
2008–09 Liga Indonesia Premier Division Stadium 
West Group Clubs Home Based Map in 2008–09 Liga Indonesia Premier Division 
East Group Clubs Home Based Map in 2008–09 Liga Indonesia Premier Division 

Second tier Indonesian football league seasons
Indonesian Premier Division seasons
2008–09 in Indonesian football leagues
Indonesia